Macaroni and cheese (also called mac and cheese in Canada and the United States and macaroni cheese in the United Kingdom) is a dish of cooked macaroni pasta and a cheese sauce, most commonly Cheddar sauce.

The traditional macaroni and cheese is a casserole baked in the oven; however, it may be prepared in a sauce pan on top of the stove or using a packaged mix. The cheese is often first incorporated into a Béchamel sauce to create a Mornay sauce, which is then added to the pasta. In the United States, it is considered a comfort food.

History
Cheese and pasta casseroles were recorded in the 14th century in the Italian cookbook, Liber de Coquina, which featured a dish of Parmesan cheese and pasta.  A cheese and pasta casserole known as makerouns was recorded in the 14th-century medieval English cookbook, the Forme of Cury. It was made with fresh, hand-cut pasta which was sandwiched between a mixture of melted butter and cheese. The recipe given (in Middle English) was:

This is the above recipe in modern English:

The first modern recipe for macaroni and cheese was included in Elizabeth Raffald's 1769 book, The Experienced English Housekeeper. Raffald's recipe is for a Béchamel sauce with cheddar cheese—a Mornay sauce in French cooking—which is mixed with macaroni, sprinkled with Parmesan, and baked until bubbly and golden.To dress Macaroni with Permasent [Parmasan] Cheese. Boil four Ounces of Macaroni ’till it be quite tender, and lay it on a Sieve to drain, then put it in a Tolling Pan, with about a Gill of good Cream, a Lump of Butter rolled in Flour, boil it five Minutes, pour it on a Plate, lay all over it Permasent Cheese toasted; send it to the Table on a Water Plate, for it soon goes cold.Another recipe from 1784 stated that the small tubes of macaroni must be boiled, then drained in a sifter before being moved to a frying pan. Heavy cream is then added to the macaroni along with a "knob of butter" rolled in flour, and it must be cooked for five minutes before being transferred to a dish and topped with toasted Parmesan and pepper. The famous British Victorian cookbook Mrs. Beeton's Book of Household Management included two instances of "Macaroni, as usually served with the Cheese Course". One of them states:

In the United Kingdom, during the 2010s, it has seen a surge in popularity, becoming widespread as a meal and as a side order in both fast food and upmarket restaurants.

United States 
The US president Thomas Jefferson and James Hemings, his slave, encountered macaroni in Paris and brought the recipe back to Monticello. Jefferson drew a sketch of the pasta and wrote detailed notes on the extrusion process. In 1793, he commissioned the US ambassador to France William Short to purchase a machine for making it. Evidently, the machine was not suitable, as Jefferson later imported both macaroni and Parmesan cheese for his use at Monticello. In 1802, Jefferson served "a pie called macaroni" at a state dinner. The menu of the dinner was reported by Reverend Manasseh Cutler, who apparently was not fond of the cheesy macaroni casserole. Nevertheless, since that time, baked macaroni and cheese has remained popular in the United States.

A recipe called "macaroni and cheese" appeared in the 1824 cookbook The Virginia House-Wife written by Mary Randolph. Randolph's recipe had three ingredients: macaroni, cheese, and butter, layered together and baked in a hot oven. The cookbook was the most influential cookbook of the 19th century, according to culinary historian Karen Hess. Similar recipes for macaroni and cheese occur in the 1852 Hand-book of Useful Arts, and the 1861 Godey's Lady's Book. By the mid-1880s, cookbooks as far west as Kansas and Festus, Missouri, included recipes for macaroni and cheese casseroles.  Factory production of the main ingredients made the dish affordable, and recipes made it accessible, but not notably popular. As it became accessible to a broader section of society, macaroni and cheese lost its upper-class appeal.

Canada 
Macaroni and cheese was brought to Canada by British immigrants, coming from other parts of the British Empire. Macaroni and cheese recipes have been attested in Canada since at least Modern Practical Cookery in 1845, which suggests a puff pastry lining (suggesting upper-class refinement); a sauce of cream, egg yolks, mace, and mustard; and grated Parmesan or Cheshire cheese on top.  Canadian Cheddar cheese was also becoming popularized at this time and was likely also used during that era.

Macaroni and cheese is very popular in contemporary Canada. Kraft Dinner is the most popular brand of packaged macaroni and cheese. Sasha Chapman, writing in The Walrus, considered it to be Canada's national dish, ahead of poutine. In fact, Canadians purchase nearly 25% of the seven million boxes of Kraft Dinner sold worldwide each week.

Variations
Pasta other than macaroni are often used: almost any short-cut extruded pasta and many of the decorative cut pasta will do, particularly those with folds and pockets to hold the cheese. The dish may still be referred to as "macaroni and cheese," "mac n' cheese," or "cheesy mac" when made with a different pasta; while "shells and cheese" are sometimes used when it is made with conchiglie.

While Cheddar cheese is most commonly used for macaroni and cheese, other cheeses may also be used — usually sharp in flavor — and two or more cheeses can be combined. Other cheeses can be used such as Gruyere, Gouda, Havarti, and Jarlsberg cheese.

Macaroni and cheese can be made by simply layering slices of cheese and pasta (often with butter or evaporated milk) then baking in a casserole, rather than preparing as a cheese sauce. Also, some like to include a crunchy topping to their baked macaroni and cheese by topping it off with bread crumbs or crushed crackers, which also keeps the noodles on top from drying out when baking.

One novelty presentation is deep-fried macaroni and cheese found at fairs and food carts.

Regional variations and analogues

In Scotland, macaroni and cheese can often be found in pies, known endearingly as a macaroni pie.

A similar traditional dish in Switzerland, dating from the 19th century, is called Älplermagronen (Alpine herder's macaroni), which is also available in boxed versions. Älplermagronen are made of macaroni, cream, cheese, roasted onions, and in some recipes, potatoes. In the Canton of Uri, the potatoes are traditionally omitted, and in some regions, bacon or ham is added. The cheese is often Emmental cheese or Appenzeller cheese. It is usually accompanied by apple sauce.

Prepared and packaged mixes

Packaged macaroni and cheese are available in frozen form or as boxed ingredients for simplified preparation. Boston Market, Michelina's, Kraft Foods, Cracker Barrel, and Stouffer's are some of the more recognizable brands of prepared and frozen macaroni and cheese available in the United States.  "Macaroni and cheese loaf", a deli meat which contains both macaroni and processed cheese bits, can be found in some stores.

A variety of packaged mixes that are prepared in a sauce pan on the stove or in a microwave oven are available. They are usually modeled on Kraft Macaroni & Cheese (known as Kraft Dinner or KD in Canada), which was introduced in 1937 with the slogan "make a meal for four in nine minutes." It was an immediate success in the US and Canada amidst the economic hardships of the Depression. During the Second World War, rationing led to increased popularity for the product which could be obtained two boxes for one food rationing stamp.  The 1953 Better Homes and Gardens Cookbook includes a recipe using Velveeta, which had been reformulated in that year. The boxed Kraft product is popular in Canada, where it is the most-purchased grocery item in the country. 

Boxed mixes consist of uncooked pasta and either a liquid cheese sauce (often labeled "deluxe") or powdered ingredients to prepare it. The powdered cheese sauce is mixed with either milk or water, and margarine, butter, or olive oil and added to the cooked pasta.  Some mixes prepared in a microwave cook the pasta in the sauce.

Another popular variant is jarred macaroni cheese sauce, which is especially popular in the UK and US, available under the Dolmio and Ragú brands, among others. The pasta is purchased and prepared separately, then mixed with the heated cheese sauce.

Powdered cheese sauce, very similar to what is found inside a box of macaroni and cheese mix, is also sold without the pasta. This product is produced by several companies, most notably Bisto, Cabot, Annie's and Kraft Foods.

Canned or tinned macaroni and cheese is available in supermarkets in the US and UK, with Heinz being the most prominent brand in the UK. These are often served on toast as a snack or as part of a breakfast.

A number of different products on the market use this basic formulation with minor variations in ingredients.

Although high in carbohydrates, calories, fat, and salt, macaroni and cheese is a source of protein and certain variations of the dish can decrease the negative health aspects.

See also

 Carbonara
 Chili mac
 Käsespätzle
 List of casserole dishes
 List of cheese dishes
 Macaroni casserole
 Macaroni pie
 Macaroni salad

References

Further reading

External links

 A brief history of mac and cheese, commentary on National Public Radio
 Steingarten, Jeffrey (1997). The Man Who Ate Everything. New York: Vintage. . The chapter, "Back of the Box", was first published in 1992. :)

American cuisine
Canadian cuisine
English cuisine
Cheese dishes
Macaroni dishes
Casserole dishes
Convenience foods
National dishes
American pasta dishes
Milk dishes
Foods featuring butter
Food combinations
Thanksgiving food